Ranga Daku is 1978 Pakistani Punjabi language biographical film directed by Arshad Mirza and produced by Ashiq Hussain. The film starred actors Sultan Rahi, Aasia, Afzaal Ahmed, Ilyas Kashmiri, and Adeeb, with Afzal Khan, Nasrullah Butt, and Sawan as guest actors along with child actors Aziz and Asif. This film is based on a true story from the British Raj period in British India.

Cast
 Sultan Rahi – Ranga Daku (title role)
 Aasia – (Lover of Ranga)
 Afzaal Ahmed – (Karnal) Sher Singh
 Kiran – (Bhabi of Ranga) 
 Samina Peerzada 
 Saiqa – (sister of Ranga) 
 Adeeb – (farangi)
 Irrum
 Nusrat Ara
 Meena Daud
 Seema
 Ilyas Kashmiri – Jageerdar
 Changezi
 Iqbal Durrani – (son of Jageerdar)
 Saleem Hasan – (son of Jageerdar)
 Rafi Khawar
 Haidar Abbas
 Anwar Majeed
 Ladla
 Hairat Angez
 Munir Zarif – (comedy actor)
 Jani – (comedy actor)

Tracklist
The music of the film Ranga Daku (1978 film) was composed by the musician Wajahat Attre. The lyrics were written by Hazin Qadri and Khawaja Pervez, and sung by Noor Jehan and Naheed Akhtar.

References

External links
 Ranga Daku biographical film 1978, film Ranga Daku (1978) on Pakistan Film Magazine, Retrieved 28 October 2015

Pakistani biographical films
Pakistani action films
Pakistani crime films
1978 films
Punjabi-language Pakistani films
Nigar Award winners
1978 directorial debut films